Guy Magenta (1927–1967) was a French composer.

1927 births
1967 deaths
French male composers
Musicians from Paris
Pseudonymous writers
20th-century French composers
20th-century French male musicians